Vincy Chan (born 16 October 1982) is a Hong Kong-Singaporean Cantopop singer. She began her singing career after winning 1st runner up at the 2005 New Talent Singing Awards and has since been signed with Emperor Entertainment Group. Her best known songs include "Feeling" (感應) and "My Memories are Not My Own" (我的回憶不是我的).

Biography
Born in Hong Kong, Chan immigrated with her family to Singapore in 1990. She attended Dunman High School in her teens and graduated from Nanyang Technological University with a degree in accounting in 2005. Upon graduating, Chan entered Project Superstar, a singing competition in Singapore and was placed among the top 24 contestants. More substantially, she returned to Hong Kong and won first runner-up and the award for "Best Style" at the 2005 New Talent Singing Awards which led to her being signed by Emperor Entertainment Group.

Career

Chan launched her solo career in 2006 with the debut single, "Feeling" (感應), for which she quickly gained popularity. She was promoted by her record company early on as a "successor to Joey Yung" and her vocals often drew her comparisons to early R&B era Faye Wong. She was widely successful as a newcomer, sweeping awards at all 4 major year-end music award shows. This included a Top 10 Gold Song Award at RTHK for "Feeling," which remains one of her signature tunes to this day.

In 2012-13, Chan released a couple of electronic albums collaborating with People Mountain Sea, the music production company founded by Anthony Wong, who was among her earliest champions. "Electrify" (通電), the lead single to the album I am Free (我自在), was widely praised by DJs at Commercial Radio Hong Kong at the time, and reached number 2 on their singles chart.

In 2015, it was the 10th debut anniversary for Vincy Chan, her popularity had rebounded again. On February 14, her first ticket-purchasing concert "Love. Love Song Swimming Er Concert" was held at the Opera House of the Hong Kong Academy for Performing Arts. A large number of friends in entertainment industry are sincerely invited to participate. In the same year, the second solo cover HI-FI audiophile disc "Feng·Love Song" was released, enabling Vincy Chan to win the "IFPI Hong Kong Record Sales Award" and "Top Ten Selling Mandarin Records" for the second time. In the end, she won the "Best Performing Female Singer" and "New Town Madden Awards Ceremony" and "New Town Madden Asian Singer" for the first time with many years of beautiful sound performance.

Vincy Chan released a new Cantonese song at the end of 2015. She sang OST for "Wu Shuangpu" named "Unique", Youtube views up to more than 1 million, extremely Word-of-mouth recognition has enabled Vincy Chan to win the "Jing Ge Golden Melody Award" for the third time.

In 2016, Vincy Chan finally released the new title song "Four Not Like" in February, becoming Vincy Chan's third "Three Channel Champion Song". The number of Youtube views reached more than 2 million and the response was satisfactory. The new album "Mirror Image" included new songs. And cover singing, the new song part will still be recorded with the equipment used to make the cover album. In the end, Yong Er won the "Best Performing Female Singer" in the "Golden Song Awards Ceremony".

In 2017, Vincy Chan launched her first solo EP "Short Stories" since she joined the industry for 12 years. The first title "A Little Pig" and the second title "Lullaby" (sung with Li Ruien) were both composed by Christopher Chak. The third major hit "Habits to Love You" made Wing Er win the "Golden Song Award" for the fourth time in the "Golden Song Award Ceremony". The English song "You Are My Sunshine" launched at the end of the year has over 1 million Youtube views.

In 2018, Vincy Chan released her third solo cover HI-FI fever disc "Fever". In April, she released the new title song "Riding a Horse", winning the eighth time of "New Town Madden Awards Ceremony" and "New Town Madden Songs" and the fifth time "Arena Golden Melody Awards Ceremony" ". In the end, she won the "Fifth Cantonese Song Ranking Award Ceremony" "Most Popular Female Singer".

In 2019, Vincy Chan launched 3 new Guangdong title songs with the theme of "Flower Series", among which, "Wild Mulan" won Yong Er the "Jing Ge Golden Melody Award" for the sixth time in the "Jing Ge Golden Melody Award". In addition to holding his first mainland solo concert "Re-sensing Vincy Chan Concert" in Dongguan on June 22, Vincy Chan also held "Renewal" on October 16 at KITEC StarHall, Kowloon Bay International Exhibition and Trade Center, Hong Kong. Induction Swimming's Concert. Finally, with the excellent reputation of the concert, she won the "New Town Madden Awards Ceremony" for the first time and "The Madden I Support Singer". In the same year, she invested in a six-figure small business and cooperated with a Swedish brand to launch her own brand of earrings.

Discography

Studio albums
2006: Vincy (感應)
2007: Flowers without Snow (花無雪)
2007: Close to You
2008: Really Want To Know You (多想認識你)
2008: Pieces of V
2009: More Vincy (多一點 泳兒)
2009: Vincy's Precious (私人珍藏)
2010: Foresee?... Encountered (預見? ...遇見。)
2011: Happy Tears (快樂眼淚) 
2011: Almost An Open Secret (半公開的秘密)
2012: Where I Touch The Sky (接近天空的地方)
2013: Free (我自在)
2014: Love & Love Songs (愛.情歌)
2015: Love In The Wind (風.情歌)
2016: Mirror Reflection (鏡像)
2018: Fever
2022: Dark Light of the Soul (花開溝渠 葉落冰川)

EPs
2017: Short Stories

Compilations
2010: Vin'Selection (New + Best Selections)

Live albums
2008: Vincy, Close to You Live (泳兒 Close To You Live 音樂會)
2009: (Vincy唱泳音樂世界Live) 
2012: Neway Music Live x Vincy (Neway Music Live X 泳兒音樂會)
2015: Love Songs, Vincy Live 2015 (愛情歌 泳兒音樂會)

Concerts

Filmography

Films 
 A Beautiful Moment (2018)
 The Midas Touch (2013)
 72 Tenants of Prosperity (2010)
 Split Second Murders (2009)
 Naraka 19 (2007)

Awards

2005
New Talent Singing Awards - 1st Runner-up
New Talent Singing Awards - Best Style
2006
RTHK 29th Top 10 Gold Song Awards - Top 10 Gold Song: "Feeling" (感應)
RTHK 29th Top 10 Gold Song Awards - Most Promising Newcomer (Gold)
CRHK Ultimate Song Chart Awards - Ultimate Newcomer (Gold)
Jade Solid Gold Best 10 Awards Presentation - Most Popular Newcomer (Gold)
Metro Radio Hit Music Awards - Hit Song: "Feeling" (感應)
Metro Radio Hit Music Awards - Hit Newcomer Female
2007
Four Stations Joint Media Awards - Breakthrough Artist (Gold)
Jade Solid Gold Best 10 Awards Presentation - Song Award: "No Heart for Singing" (無心戀唱)
Metro Radio Hit Music Awards - Hit Song: "Flowers without Snow" (花無雪)
2008
Four Stations Joint Media Awards - Breakthrough Artist (Silver)
Metro Radio Hit Music Awards - Hit Song: "Let the World Look at Me" (世界請看著我)
2009
RTHK 29th Top 10 Gold Song Awards - Top 10 Gold Song: "My Memories are Not My Own" (我的回憶不是我的) with Ocean Hai
Metro Radio Hit Music Awards - Hit Song: "A Single Stroke" (一撇)
2010
Metro Radio Hit Music Awards - Hit Song: (無緣罪)
2011
Metro Radio Hit Music Awards - Hit Song: "Who Will Love Me?" (有誰來愛我)
2013
Metro Radio Hit Music Awards - Hit Song: "Electrify" (通電)
2014
RTHK 37th Top 10 Gold Song Awards - Outstanding Mandarin Song (Silver): "Ordinary Friends" (普通朋友)
Jade Solid Gold Best 10 Awards Presentation - Song Award: "Wishing Upon a Star" (星語心願)
Metro Radio Hit Music Awards - Hit Vocal Performance 
Metro Radio Hit Music Awards - Hit Jazz Singer
2015 
Jade Solid Gold Best 10 Awards Presentation - Best Female Performance
Metro Radio Hit Music Awards - Hit Asia Singer
Metro Radio Hit Music Awards - Hit Jazz Singer
2016
Jade Solid Gold Best 10 Awards Presentation - Best Female Performance
Jade Solid Gold Best 10 Awards Presentation - Song Award: "One & Only" (獨一無二)
2021
ViuTV Chill Club Music Awards Presentation - One of the Top 10 songs: "溝渠暢泳" 
Metro Radio Hit Music Awards 2021 - Metro Hit Female Singer
2022
Metro Radio Hit Music Awards 2022 - Metro Hit Female Singer
2023
Ultimate Song Chart Awards 2022 - Ultimate Female Singer (Silver)

References

External links 

Vincy Chan's Official Fans Club Web Site 
Vincy Chan's Official Website 
Vincy Chan on Instagram
Vincy Chan Official Facebook
Vincy Chan on Weibo

1982 births
Living people
Cantopop singers
Hong Kong emigrants to Singapore
Nanyang Technological University alumni
New Talent Singing Awards contestants
21st-century Singaporean women singers
Dunman High School alumni